Lincoln Township is a former township of Emmons County, North Dakota, United States. The township recorded a population of 28 during the 2000 Census.

History
Lincoln township existed briefly as a school township with a population of 153 during the 1920 Census, but was counted as part of survey township T135 North, R75 West, in subsequent censuses. It was later organized as a civil township from 1981 until 2007, when the area was added the unorganized territory of North Emmons.

References

External links
 U.S. Census map of Campbell Township during the 2000 Census

Defunct townships in North Dakota
Former townships in Emmons County, North Dakota